The 2012–13 Philippine Basketball Association (PBA) Philippine Cup Finals was the best-of-7 championship series of the 2012–13 PBA Philippine Cup, and the conclusion of the conference's playoffs. The Talk 'N Text Tropang Texters and the Rain or Shine Elasto Painters competed for the 107th championship contested by the league.

Talk 'N Text defeated Rain or Shine by sweeping the series, 4–0 and winning their third consecutive Philippine Cup. The Tropang Texters will also have permanent possession of the Jun Bernardino Trophy, which is awarded to the champions of the tournament since the 2006–07 season.

Background

Road to the finals

Head-to-head matchup
The lone conference head-to-head matchup of the two teams was won by Talk 'N Text.

Series summary

Game 1

Game 2

Game 3

Game 4

Rosters

{| class="toccolours" style="font-size: 95%; width: 100%;"
|-
! colspan="2" style="background-color: #; color: #; text-align: center;" | Talk 'N Text Tropang Texters Philippine Cup roster
|- style="background-color:#; color: #; text-align: center;"
! Players !! Coaches
|-
| valign="top" |
{| class="sortable" style="background:transparent; margin:0px; width:100%;"
! Pos. !! # !! POB !! Name !! Height !! Weight !! !! College 
|-
 

 

 

{| class="toccolours" style="font-size: 95%; width: 100%;"
|-
! colspan="2" style="background-color: #; color: #; text-align: center;" | Rain or Shine Elasto Painters Philippine Cup roster
|- style="background-color:#; color: #; text-align: center;"
! Players !! Coaches
|-
| valign="top" |
{| class="sortable" style="background:transparent; margin:0px; width:100%;"
! Pos. !! # !! POB !! Name !! Height !! Weight !! !! College 
|-

Broadcast notes

Additional Game 4 crew:
Trophy presentation: Aaron Atayde
Dugout interviewer: Erika Padilla

References

External links
PBA official website

2013
2012–13 PBA season
Rain or Shine Elasto Painters games
TNT Tropang Giga games
PBA Philippine Cup Finals